Franz Neuländter (born 29 January 1966) is an Austrian former ski jumper.

Career
He won a bronze medal in the team large hill event at the 1987 FIS Nordic World Ski Championships in Oberstdorf and finished 6th in the individual large hill in the 1989 championships. Neuländter won a silver medal at the FIS Ski Flying World Championships 1986. He also had two individual victories in his career (1989, 1990).

World Cup

Standings

Wins

References

1966 births
Austrian male ski jumpers
Living people
FIS Nordic World Ski Championships medalists in ski jumping
People from Braunau am Inn District
Sportspeople from Upper Austria
20th-century Austrian people